Sebastian Krzysztof Świderski (born 26 June 1977) is a Polish former professional volleyball player and coach. He was a member of the Poland national team from 1996 to 2011. A participant at the Olympic Games (Athens 2004, Beijing 2008), and a silver medallist at the 2006 World Championship. Since 2021, Świderski has been president of the Polish Volleyball Federation.

Career as player

Clubs

Świderski's first club as a player was Znicz Gorzów Wielkopolski. Then, he played for Stilon Gorzów Wielkopolski, with whom he won bronze and silver medals of the Polish Championship and Polish Cup in 1997. In 2000, he started playing for Mostostal Azoty Kędzierzyn-Koźle. With the club from Kędzierzyn-Koźle, Świderski won the Polish Cup twice (in 2001, 2002) and three titles of Polish Champion in 2001, 2002, 2003. During the 2002/2003 season, the club won the bronze medal in the CEV Champions League. He moved to Italian Serie A in 2003, where he played four seasons in Perugia Volley and three seasons in Lube Banca Macerata. He played in shirt number 16 in order to honor the memory of the player Arkadiusz Gołaś, who died tragically on his way to the club from Macerata. With the club from Perugia, Świderski won a silver medal at the Italian Championship in season 2004/2005. Whilst playing for Lube Banca Macerata, he won two Italian Cups (2008, 2009), Italian SuperCup 2008 and a bronze medal in the Italian Championship 2008/2009. He ended his sporting career after his final two seasons in PlusLiga playing for ZAKSA. In 2011, he won a silver medal in the CEV Cup and the Polish Championship.

National team
Świderski made his international debut for Poland in December 1997 against Israel, losing 3-1. He has since participated in the Olympic Games at both Athens in 2004 and Beijing in 2008 for Poland, finishing 5th both times. He is a silver medalist of World Championship 2006. He ended his career during an official ceremony after match of national team in 2012 in Katowice.

Career as coach
In 2012, Świderski made his debut as a coach; he was appointed to work in this role for a PlusLiga club, Fart Kielce. In the next season, he worked as an assistant coach in ZAKSA Kędzierzyn-Koźle, where the first coach was Daniel Castellani. From 2013 to 2015, he was the head coach of ZAKSA. The first trophy which he won as the head coach, was the Polish Cup in 2014.

Honours

As a player
 CEV Cup
  2010/2011 – with ZAKSA Kędzierzyn-Koźle
 National championships
 1996/1997  Polish Cup, with Stilon Gorzów Wielkopolski
 2000/2001  Polish Cup, with Mostostal Azoty Kędzierzyn-Koźle
 2000/2001  Polish Championship, with Mostostal Azoty Kędzierzyn-Koźle
 2001/2002  Polish Cup, with Mostostal Azoty Kędzierzyn-Koźle
 2001/2002  Polish Championship, with Mostostal Azoty Kędzierzyn-Koźle
 2002/2003  Polish Championship, with Mostostal Azoty Kędzierzyn-Koźle
 2007/2008  Italian SuperCup, with Lube Banca Marche Macerata
 2007/2008  Italian Cup, with Lube Banca Marche Macerata
 2008/2009  Italian Cup, with Lube Banca Marche Macerata
 Youth national team
 1996  CEV U20 European Championship
 1997  FIVB U21 World Championship

As a coach
 National championships
 2013/2014  Polish Cup, with ZAKSA Kędzierzyn-Koźle

Individual awards
 2000: Polish Championship – Most Valuable Player
 2008: Olympic Games – Best Spiker

State awards
 2006:  Gold Cross of Merit

References

External links

 
 
 Player profile at LegaVolley.it 
 Player profile at PlusLiga.pl 
 
 
 Coach/Player profile at Volleybox.net

1977 births
Living people
People from Skwierzyna
Sportspeople from Lubusz Voivodeship
Polish men's volleyball players
Olympic volleyball players of Poland
Volleyball players at the 2008 Summer Olympics
Volleyball players at the 2004 Summer Olympics
Polish volleyball coaches
Volleyball coaches of international teams
Recipients of the Gold Cross of Merit (Poland)
ZAKSA Kędzierzyn-Koźle players
Volley Lube players
ZAKSA Kędzierzyn-Koźle coaches
Outside hitters